The men's 200 metres at the 2012 IPC Athletics European Championships was held at Stadskanaal Stadium from 24–28 July.

Medalists
Results given by IPC Athletics.

Results

T11
Final
(Non-medal event)

T12
Heats

Semifinals

Final

T13
Heats

Final

T34
Final

T35
Final

T36
Final

T37
Final

T38
Final

T42
Final

T44
Final

T46
Final

T53

See also
List of IPC world records in athletics

References

200 metres
200 metres at the World Para Athletics European Championships